Dart Lifeboat Station is the base for Royal National Lifeboat Institution (RNLI) search and rescue operations at Dartmouth, Devon in England. The present station was opened in 2007 although an earlier lifeboat was stationed in the town from 1878 to 1896. It operates a D class (IB1) inshore lifeboat (ILB).

History
Dartmouth is a small port on the west side of the natural harbour formed by the River Dart. In the 1860s the Dartmouth and Torbay Railway established more quays on the opposite bank at Kingswear. The RNLI approved that Dartmouth Lifeboat Station be established at Dartmouth in July 1876 but it was 1878 before a lifeboat arrived. During the summer the lifeboat was kept in a boat house at Sand Quay, but during the winter it was kept afloat in Warfleet Creek where it was quicker to respond to any ships in distress. It would prove difficult for the rowing lifeboat to leave the estuary of the Dart if the wind was blowing from the sea unless a tug was able to help. The station was closed in 1896 and during all that time just one effective service was provided. That was on 20 September 1887 when the crew attended a trawler near Kingswear Castle. The boat house is now used by the Dartmouth Amateur Rowing Club.

In 2007 a new lifeboat was sent to Dartmouth, although the new station was to be named the Dart Lifeboat Station after the river, rather than the town. A temporary building with five years planning agreement was erected in Coronation Park. The lifeboat is kept on a carriage and is towed to the river for launching by a tractor.

Area of operation
It covers the River Dart and the nearby south Devon coast. Adjacent lifeboats – both ILBs and All Weather Boats – are at Torbay Lifeboat Station to the East, and Salcombe Lifeboat Station to the West.

Lifeboats
'ON' is the RNLI's sequential Official Number; 'Op. No.' is the operational number painted onto the boat.

Dartmouth (1878–1896)

Dart (from 2007)

See also
NCI Froward Point - National Coastwatch Institution for the coast near Dartmouth

References

Bibliography

External links
 Dart lifeboat station on the RNLI website
 Station website

Lifeboat stations in Devon
Dartmouth, Devon